Jason Wilson may refer to:

 Jason Wilson (politician) (born 1968), Democratic member of the Ohio Senate
 Jason Wilson (musician) (born 1970), Canadian musician and author
 Jason Wilson (field hockey), Australian national team field hockey player
 Jason Wilson (ice hockey) (born 1990), Canadian ice hockey player
 Jason Wilson (triathlete) (born 1990), triathlete from Barbados
 Jason Wilson (darts player) (born 1969), British darts player